The 1980 Boise State Broncos football team represented Boise State University in the 1980 NCAA Division I-AA football season. The Broncos competed in the Big Sky Conference and played their home games at Bronco Stadium in Boise, Idaho. They were led by fifth-year head coach Jim Criner and the "Four Horseman" senior backfield: quarterback Joe Aliotti, fullback David Hughes, halfback Cedric Minter, with halfback Terry Zahner in reserve.

The previous season, the Broncos had a 10–1 record and were undefeated in the Big Sky, but were on probation for a scouting violation in November 1978, making them ineligible for the conference title or the 1979 I-AA playoffs.

Regular season
The Broncos finished the regular season in 1980 at 8–3 and 6–1 in conference to win their fifth Big Sky title in eleven seasons, their first since 1977. BSU defeated their two Division I-A opponents, but lost a road contest in November to Cal Poly-SLO, the eventual Division II national champions, whom they had routed at the end of the previous season.

The Broncos easily defeated rival Idaho, then ranked ninth, for the fourth consecutive year in mid-October in Boise.  During halftime of the Nevada-Reno game on November 8, BSU dedicated the playing field at Bronco Stadium to athletic director and former head coach Lyle Smith. The only conference setback was a one-point loss in late September at Montana State, the difference was a last-minute two-point conversion.

Division I-AA playoffs
The Broncos were invited to the four-team I-AA playoffs.  As Big Sky champions with a substantial stadium and fan base, BSU was chosen to host in the first round, a national semifinal on December 13, three weeks after the completion of the regular season.  The opponent was Grambling State, coached by legend Eddie Robinson.  The Broncos won 14–9 in sub-freezing fog and advanced to the 1980 NCAA Division I-AA Football Championship Game the following week in California against defending champion , coached by Roy Kidd. In a back-and-forth contest played in the fog at Hughes Stadium in Sacramento, Boise State won 31–29 to win their only I-AA national title.

The Broncos returned to the I-AA semifinals the following season and 1990, and the title game in 1994; they moved up to Division I-A

Schedule

Roster

NFL Draft
One Bronco senior was selected in the 1981 NFL Draft, which lasted twelve rounds (332 selections).

References

External links
 Bronco Football Stats – 1980

Boise State
Boise State Broncos football seasons
NCAA Division I Football Champions
Big Sky Conference football champion seasons
Boise State Broncos football